Professional Rapper is the only studio album by American rapper Lil Dicky. It was released on July 31, 2015, by Commission Records, Dirty Burd Music and Alternative Distribution Alliance. The album features guest appearances from Snoop Dogg, Rich Homie Quan, Fetty Wap and Jace, Viper, Brendon Urie of Panic! at the Disco, and T-Pain, alongside narrations from Hannibal Buress and Lil Dicky's parents.

The album debuted at number seven on the US Billboard 200, with first-week sales of 22,000 copies, created a total of 26,000 equivalent album units in the United States.

Background
On May 22, 2013, Lil Dicky self-released his first official mixtape, titled So Hard. Following the release of the mixtape, Dicky began using the Kickstarter website, to create a goal of raising $70,000 for him to release his upcoming first studio album, with accompanying music videos and tours. On November 20, 2013, Kickstarter projected a month-long for a crowdfunding period of reaching a fundraising goal within a week. The fundraising was dramatically successful, raising it at a total of $113,017.

Singles
The album's lead single, "Lemme Freak", was released on September 17, 2014. The song was produced by Jim Cummings. The music video received over 90 million views as of May 2021.

The album's second single, "White Crime", was released on December 10, 2014. The song was produced by Roger Goodman. The music video received over 21 million views as of May 2021.

The album's third single, "Save Dat Money", was released on June 10, 2015. The song features guest appearances from American rappers Fetty Wap and Rich Homie Quan, with production by Money Alwayz. The song peaked at number 71 on the US Billboard Hot 100. The music video received over 165 million views as of May 2021.

The album's title track, "Professional Rapper", was released as the album's fourth and final single on July 31, 2015. The song features a guest appearance from American rapper Snoop Dogg, with production by Stan Lane. The music video received over 207 million views as of May 2021.

Other songs
The music video for "Molly" was released on June 9, 2016. The music video features Lil Dicky as a dejected wedding guest as he watches his lost love (portrayed by Isabelle Loeb) get married. Brendon Urie of Panic! at the Disco is also featured in the music video as a wedding singer.

The music video for "Pillow Talking" was released on April 12, 2017. The music video's high use of special effects reportedly cost $700,000 to create, making it the 49th most expensive music video of all time.

Commercial performance
Professional Rapper debuted at number seven on the Billboard 200, with first-week sales of 22,000 copies, created a total of 26,000 equivalent album units in the United States. The album debuted at number one consecutively on Comedy Albums, Rap Albums and Independent Albums charts.

Track listing
Credits adapted from BMI.

Charts and certifications

Weekly charts

Year-end charts

Certifications

See also 

 List of Billboard number-one Rap albums of 2015

References

2015 debut albums
Lil Dicky albums
Self-released albums